WDKD was a radio station at 1310 AM and licensed to Kingstree, South Carolina, United States. Last owned by Community Broadcasters, LLC, it last aired on the programming of W246BX, or "97.1 Frank FM", the HD-2 channel of WSIM.

History
WDKD previously simulcast WSIM, which was an oldies station with the slogan "good time rock and roll," which later became an adult contemporary station.

Then it simulcast 97.1 Frank FM, which was a WSIM HD-2 channel but moved to full-power WFRK.

Community Broadcasters surrendered WDKD's license to the Federal Communications Commission on November 16, 2021, which cancelled it the same day. Due to that, W246BX started simulcasting WTQS.

External links
FCC Station Search Details: DWDKD (Facility ID: 15835)
FCC History Cards for WDKD (covering 1964-1978)
Community Broadcasters Florence Stations

DKD
Radio stations established in 1949
Radio stations disestablished in 2021
1949 establishments in South Carolina
2021 disestablishments in South Carolina
Defunct radio stations in the United States
DKD